Chvalovice may refer to places in the Czech Republic:

Chvalovice (Prachatice District), a municipality and village in the South Bohemian Region
Chvalovice (Znojmo District), a municipality and village in the South Moravian Region
Chvalovice, a village and part of Kovanice in the Central Bohemian Region